The Galloping Goose Regional Trail is a  rail trail between Victoria, British Columbia, Canada, and the ghost town of Leechtown, north of Sooke, where it meets the old Sooke Flowline. Maintained by the Capital Regional District (CRD), the trail forms part of the Trans-Canada Trail, and intersects the Lochside Regional Trail.  The section from Harbour Road in Esquimalt to the Veterans Memorial Parkway in Langford is also part of the Vancouver Island Trail.

The trail is a popular route both for commuting and recreation, including within urban areas of Victoria (Vic West and Burnside-Gorge). It is frequented by people walking, running, cycling, rollerblading, skateboarding and (in places) riding horses. It connects up with many other trails and parks in the area.

The trail was created in 1987 on the former right-of-way of the Canadian National Railway, and runs through the communities of Sooke, Metchosin, Colwood, Langford, View Royal, Saanich, and Victoria as well as the unincorporated community of East Sooke.

The trail surface is paved between the west terminus (Johnson Street Bridge) to Wale Road in Colwood, approximately 13 km, or one quarter of its total length. It connects to a multi-use path across the bridge and bike lanes along Pandora Avenue.

In 1996 two important connecting links were opened: the rebuilt Selkirk Trestle (across the Selkirk Water). and the Switch Bridge over the Trans-Canada Highway.

The trail was named after the local gas-powered passenger car (No. 15813) that ran on the line from 1922 to 1931. However, the name is disputed by the Sooke Region Museum and longtime Sooke residents who say that the term Galloping Goose was not used for the old rail line; it was applied by CRD marketing staff to the trail.

Although maps show Leechtown as being the end of the trail, this area has been restricted since 2007, as part of the Greater Victoria water supply. In 2010, a warning sign and locked gate were erected before the end of the trail. Leechtown itself is not accessible.

References

External links
Capital Regional District's Regional Trails Brochure

Galloping Goose Web-Site
 Explore Vancouver Island
 55 km Galloping Goose Regional Trail

Rail trails in British Columbia
Historic trails and roads in British Columbia
Transport in the Capital Regional District
Bike paths in British Columbia